The Michigan River  is a tributary of the North Platte River, approximately  long, in north central Colorado in the United States. It drains a rural part of the eastern side of North Park in eastern Jackson County. It descends north then west to flow past the south end of Cameron Pass, and descends from the pass along the route of State Highway 14, past Gould, then northwest through the ranch country of North Park, where it becomes a largely braided stream with a wide river bottom. It passes just east of Walden, and  receives the Illinois River from the south just north of Walden. It joins the North Platte from the south approximately 5 miles (8 km) downstream to the north.

See also
List of rivers of Colorado

References

External links
Local Backcountry Advocacy

Rivers of Jackson County, Colorado
Rivers of Colorado
Tributaries of the North Platte River